Uma Sashi (1915 – 6 December 2000) was an Indian Bengali film actress who appeared in many roles from 1929 to 1951. Her on-screen pairings with actors such as Durgadas Bannerjee, K. L. Saigal, Pahari Sanyal and Prithviraj Kapoor were popular in those days.

Early life 
Uma Sashi  was born on 1915  in a poor Brahmin family of Calcutta. He was a Kirtan artist and sometimes  act as a Jatra artist in a local Jatra group. As a child Uma received a very little formal education in a local school due to poverty. She received dance and music training from the age of four. Miss Satkari Ganguly was her first music and dance teacher. As Satkari Ganguly was herself an actress, she introduced Uma Sashi to stage and theatre where she started work as a group dancer in theatrical plays like Minerva, Alfred and Russa. Soon after, she started playomg minor roles and became a part of a touring Jatra group from Kolkata to different parts of undivided Bengal like Chittagong, Cox's Bazar etc. She was a perfectionist and received elocution lessons from several Hindi, Urdu and English tutors to perfect pronunciation of these languages. After her Debut in Bangabala a silent movie she had to quit the stage because the authorities would not allow their paid staff to work in films.

Career
Uma Sashi started as an actor in the silent movie Bangabala in a small  role in the movie Subarna.  The other silent films she acted in are Bigraha  (1930) and Abhishek (1931). During this time she started recording songs for Columbia Records (India) and then to Hindusthan Musical Products as Smt. Uma Devi. 
Uma Sashi  appeared in many silent movies as an actor.  In 1931, She  appeared in the first Bengali language sound film, Dena Paona (1931),() which was a major hit. In this movie she acted in a crowd scene of Gajan and also sang a song “ Baba Apan Bhola Moder Pagal Chhele “ along with Miss Abhavati. She received training in singing from the legendary music director Pankaj Kumar Mallick and recorded songs such as 'Duniya rang rangili baba' with him for the movie Dharti Mata. Uma Sashi 's first leading role was in Chandidas(1932) movie of New Theatres where she played the role of Rami.

Personal life
Uma Sashi  married Mr Guru Prasad Dev, an attorney by profession, and a member of the Shobhabazar Rajbari when she was at the top of her career. In those days  it was not easy for a  glamorous actress to become a member of such a conservative family.  So she had to wait for quite some time to allowed into the ancestral house of Mr Guru Prasad Dev.  Uma Sashi was Guru Prasad Dev's second wife and had to share the house of her husband with his first wife.  Later she becomes a mother of three sons and a daughter. After her marriage she mostly remained outside the film industry. In her later years, Uma Sashi occasionally gave interviews in the print and electronic media and attended film functions, on rare occasions.

Death
Uma Sashi died on 6 December 2000. The news of her death only came to light in the media a few days later.

Awards and nominations
She attended BFJA award giving ceremony as a chief guest. She got the Hero Honda award as the living legend in 2000.

Filmography

References

External links 
 

1915 births
Indian film actresses
Actresses in Hindi cinema
Actresses in Bengali cinema
20th-century Indian actresses
20th-century Bengalis
Bengali Hindus
2000 deaths
Bengali theatre personalities
Indian stage actresses
Indian women screenwriters
20th-century Indian screenwriters
Indian silent film actresses
Kirtan performers
Indian playback singers
Bengali singers
Hindi-language singers
Indian singers
Indian women singers
Indian musical theatre actresses
Singers from Kolkata